Lyall is an English given name. People with the name include:

 Lyall Brooks (born 1978), Australian actor 
 Lyall Hall (1861–1935), Australian politician
 Lyall Hanson (1929–2018), Canadian politician
 Lyall Howard (1896–1955), World War I veteran, business owner, father of Australian Prime Minister John Howard
 Lyall Meyer (born 1982), South African cricket player
 Lyall Munro Jnr (born 1951), Australian Aboriginal rights activist and elder
 Lyall Munro Snr (1931–2020), Australian Aboriginal rights activist and elder
 Lyall Smith (1914–1991), American sports writer
 Lyall Watson (1939–2008), South African biologist and anthropologist

See also
 Lyall (disambiguation)
 Lyall (surname)

Given names originating from a surname